Asami Yoshida may refer to:

, Japanese basketball player
, Japanese voice actress